Wangaratta is a rural locality in the Shire of Burdekin, Queensland, Australia.

History 

References 

Shire of Burdekin
Localities in Queensland